Maria "Madi" Helen Bacon (1906–2001) was the founder of the San Francisco Boys Chorus (SFBC).  The SFBC was the first boys’ repertory chorus in the nation.  Bacon served at the conductor and music director of the group until her retirement in 1972.

Family
Bacon was the daughter of Charles Bacon and Marie Francisca Emile von Rosthorn.  She had four older brothers, one of which died in infancy.  One of her brothers was Ernst Bacon, a Pulitzer Prize–winning composer.  Bacon's mother Marie tutored her at home until she was 11.  Bacon then attended the Francis W. Parker School in Chicago.

Education
Bacon graduated from high school in 1922 and obtained an undergraduate degree in romance languages from the University of Chicago.  In 1931 she taught music at Glencoe Public School.  Never having had any formal classes in music history, she studied music history on her own.  To supplement this studying, Bacon created the Elizabethan Madrigal Singers as a way to hear the music she was studying about.  She also created the Winnetka Mixed Chorus and the Roosevelt College Chorus during this time.

Outstanding Works
In 1941, Bacon received her graduate degree from the University of Chicago.  She joined the faculty of the Central YMCA College, which later moved to Roosevelt University.  Bacon served many music positions throughout her life.  In 1946 she headed the Music Extension Division at the University of California-Berkeley where she expanded the extension program and created a community choir.  She firmly believed in creating musical opportunities for the community.  Bacon eventually retired from the university to start the San Francisco Boys Chorus.

Controversy
There was a scandal involving child sexual assault allegations taking place within the SFBC. William Farmer, an administrator of the San Francisco Boys Chorus summer camp, was accused of sexually assaulting young chorus students. There is evidence that Bacon not only was aware of such illicit activity, but also casually ignored and even reprimanded the victims. In one particular instance where a victim confronted Bacon, she is particularly transparent regarding her position on child abuse: "In conversations with U.S. News, Madi Bacon expressed dismay that [Ross] Cheit had broken the code of silence. ``I don't see what good it's going to do for a young man with a family to be known publicly as having been abused. I mean it's such bad taste. And for Ross to involve other boys is serious. The boys would say that's snitching, wouldn't they?". There is another daunting example demonstrating Bacon's disillusioned impropriety: "Much to his surprise, says Cheit, at the mention of Farmer's name, Bacon launched into how she'd once almost had to fire the man for what she called hobnobbing with one of the boys. When Cheit told her he had been one of those boys, he says, Bacon said that if he'd been a strong kid he would have shaken it off. And why didn't he tell his friends, she wanted to know. Didn't he want to protect them? (Asked about the conversation, Bacon told U.S. News she "may well have said those things, but I don't remember." Elsewhere, Bacon said that had she known of the abuse, she would have done something.)". This apparent contradiction has generated controversy regarding her accomplishments and her overall legacy.

Other
Bacon was an honorary member of Sigma Alpha Iota.  She had a lifelong interest in the outdoors and was a member of the Sierra Club.

She died on January 23, 2001.

References

External links 

1906 births
2001 deaths
Music directors
University of Chicago alumni
People from Chicago
Roosevelt University faculty